Megachile mimetica is a species of bee in the family Megachilidae. It was described by Theodore Dru Alison Cockerell in 1933.

References

Mimetica
Insects described in 1933